Michał Cieślak (born 6 September 1968 in Sierpc) is a Polish rowing cox.

References 
 
 

1968 births
Living people
People from Sierpc
Polish male rowers
Rowers at the 1992 Summer Olympics
Olympic bronze medalists for Poland
Coxswains (rowing)
Olympic rowers of Poland
Olympic medalists in rowing
Sportspeople from Masovian Voivodeship
World Rowing Championships medalists for Poland
Medalists at the 1992 Summer Olympics